Captain William Henry Hubbard DFC (19 May 1886—19 June 1960) was a Canadian World War I flying ace credited with twelve aerial victories against enemy fighter planes despite spending a year and a half out of action. He was noted for his zeal in ground support missions, as well as his success against enemy fighters.

Military service
Hubbard had moved to Toronto in 1915 when he volunteered for military service. He was commissioned a second lieutenant in the Special Reserve on 1 January 1916. On 9 May 1916, he received Royal Aero Club pilot's certificate no. 2871. On 8 September, while flying a Royal Aircraft Factory BE.2c for No. 5 Squadron RFC, he destroyed a Fokker Eindekker over Saint-Julien. On the day after Christmas, he was severely wounded by Erwin Boehme. Upon recovery, he was posted to Home Establishment as an instructor. He remained there until he was promoted Captain and appointed Flight Commander in No. 73 Squadron RAF, flying a Sopwith Camel. Beginning 11 April 1918, he began to score a steady trickle of wins that took to a total of a dozen on 8 October. It was during this time that he earned both the DFC and a Bar in lieu of a second award; they were awarded more for his ground support missions than aerial success. At any rate, he ended the war with a tally of four German fighter planes destroyed, one set afire in midair, one captured, and six driven down out of control.

Military honors
Distinguished Flying Cross

Capt. William Henry Hubbard,

During recent operations he has repeatedly
descended to low altitudes to release his
bombs and to open machine-gun fire on
troops and transport. He has shown the
greatest gallantry, judgment and presence
of mind. On several occasions he has
attacked and driven down out of control
enemy aeroplanes.

Bar to Distinguished Flying Cross

Capt. William Henry Hubbard, D.F.C.
(FRANCE.)

This officer has shown great bravery and
devotion to duty both in destroying enemy
aircraft—ten of which he has accounted for
—and in silencing anti-Tank guns. On
27 September, flying at altitudes between
200 and 1,500 feet, he engaged and silenced
many anti-Tank guns, thereby rendering
valuable service. He at the same time completed
a detailed and accurate reconnaissance
of the area, locating the position of
our troops.

Aerial victories

Endnotes

References
 Franks, Norman and Hal Giblin (2003). Under the Guns of the Kaiser's Aces: Bohme, Muller, Von Tutschek and Wolff: The Complete Record of Their Victories and Victims. Grub Street. , .
 

1886 births
1960 deaths
Canadian World War I flying aces